Accident of birth is a phrase pointing out that no one has any control of, or responsibility for, the circumstances of their birth or parentage. With a modern scientific understanding of genetics, one can reasonably call any human being's entire genome an accident of birth. The place of birth of a baby has an effect in immigration law of many nations, so that an "accidental" birth in an airport lounge may entitle a person to a passport in later life.

More broadly, gender, family circumstances, cultural background, access to education, career opportunities, inheritance rights, are all examples of accidents of birth.

See also
 Accident (philosophy)
 Original position

Family